A Flat is a Hindi thriller film, directed by Hemant Madhukar and produced by Anjum Rizvi.The film was released on 12 November 2010 under the Anjum Rizvi Film Company and Y.T Entertainment Ltd. banners.

Plot
The story follows Rahul (Jimmy Sheirgill), a young businessman who comes back from the U.S. to patch things up with his girlfriend Preeti (Kaveri Jha). His father, Varma (Sachin Khedekar) is mysteriously murdered as he goes to find a flat for Rahul. His friend Karan (Sanjay Suri), a rich salesman, gives his old flat to Rahul. After Rahul enters the flat, his life takes an unexpected turn when the unexplainable disappearance of Preeti takes place, and finally Rahul finds himself trapped in his own flat. With no connection to the outside world, Rahul is stuck and realises that a ghost is living in the flat with him, who won't let him go. He tries to contact Karan, but is unsuccessful. He then finds a diary in his room, which is opened by the ghost who allows him to read it.

It turns out the diary belongs to Geethika (Hazel Crowney), a young village girl living out her childhood even at an adult age. She finds Karan coming to her village to build many buildings, and Karan uses Geethika's father's help. When her father cancels it of due to the suicide of her sister, Karan can't take the loss, and runs away with Geethika pretending to be in love with her. Back in a flashback, it is shown the two coming to foreign and getting married in the same flat Rahul is living in. Karan explains that he will return in a few days, but doesn't come back until many months. In his absence, Varma visits Geethika and takes advantage and tries to rape her. She uses self-defence, and tells him to get out. She begins to cry, only to realise she is pregnant. Karan comes back, and tells her to abort the baby because he is already married to someone else. She dies during the abortion, and Karan hides her body so nobody would blame him for her death.

The diary ends, and Rahul investigates that the ghost is Geethika's, and it wants revenge on Karan. Firstly Rahul refuses, though when severely attacked several times, he agrees. He calls Karan over, and tells him everything. He gives the flat keys back, and walks out, and looking back, Karan is now trapped in the flat with no way of getting out. Rahul walks out of the building, and looks at the window, only to see Geethika's ghost approaching Karan, and the curtains closing with Karan shouting for help. Rahul now realises that except for Geethika's revenge, the ghost's appearance had another meaning, for him to sort out his love life with Preeti. He rings Preeti, and apologises about every mistake he did, the two make-up and get married.

Cast
 Jimmy Sheirgill as Rahul Varma
 Sanjay Suri as Karan
 Hazel Crowney as Geethika Singh
 Kaveri Jha as Preeti Rastogi
 Sachin Khedekar as Varma
 Aindritha Ray as Karan's Wife
 Satwant Kaur as Mrs Digvijay Singh
 Saurabh Dubey as Ajay Rastogi

Crew
 director       - Hemant Madhukar
 producer       - Anjum Rizvi
 writer         - Ajay Monga, Hemant Madhukar
 music          - Bappi Lahiri
 cinematography - Manoj Shaw
 editing        - Bunty Nagi
 Associate Directors - Karan Sharma, Kushal Srivastava, Mehboob

Soundtrack
The music was composed By Bappi Lahiri and released by T-Series. All lyrics were written by Virag Mishra.

References

External links 
 

Hindi-language horror films
2010 films
2010s Hindi-language films
Indian horror thriller films
Indian ghost films
Films set in Mumbai
Films shot in Mumbai
Films directed by Hemant Madhukar